Archipimima labyrinthopa is a species of moth of the family Tortricidae. It is found in Brazil in the states of Santa Catarina and Paraná.

The wingspan is about 17 mm. The ground colour of the forewings is olive grey, brownish grey or yellowish brown. The markings are darker and usually edged with creamy. The hindwings are whitish creamy, mixed with brown on the periphery.

References

Moths described in 1932
Atteriini
Moths of South America